Commercial Bay Shopping Centre is a shopping centre in the Auckland CBD, Auckland, New Zealand. It is situated at 11–19 Customs Street West between Lower Albert Street and the Britomart Transport Centre.

The centre was known as Downtown Shopping Centre, formerly Westfield Downtown, as a smaller shopping centre with 12,417 m2 gross lettable area  In late 2012, it was sold by Westfield to Precinct Properties Holdings New Zealand Limited, formerly AMP NZ Office Limited (ANZO). The building closed on 28 May 2016 after 41 years, and by 23 November had been demolished. A high-rise and new mall building was built on the site, with the future City Rail Link tunnels going through the foundations of the building.

The development is named "Commercial Bay", referring to the area's previous name in the 1900s. The first shop of the new Commercial Bay development, an H&M store, was opened in August 2018. Following multiple delays, the main shopping mall of the new Commercial Bay development was completed in June 2020.

History

The original mall (opened 30 April 1975) had approximately 80 stores on three floors, with the three major stores being The Warehouse, Warehouse Stationery and Postie Plus. It was one of the few Westfield Group malls that did not provide a supermarket, but was also the only proper mall in the entire CBD area. In later years it was also known for being covered almost completely by huge exterior billboards, which repeatedly drew the ire of Council officers.

In 2005, the centre had retail sales of NZ$56.9 million, and 5.8 million customer visits per year. These were mostly CBD workers, tourists and the growing inner-city population. However, the centre had been called Westfield's most underperforming shopping centre in New Zealand. Lying in the middle of a much more densely built up CBD and being considered underdeveloped with only three storeys above ground, various other plans for the site were mooted during its latter years. The centre was valued at NZ$79.1 million (2009 data).

In 2008, Westfield received approval via non-notified resource consent for a 41-storey office skyscraper (including a 2 level retail podium) on the site. The permission came under fire, as it was granted without protection requirements for a future rail tunnel from Britomart Transport Centre, which would have to pass under the building. However, in October 2008, ONTRACK noted that it had reached an agreement in principle with the owners of Westfield Downtown to allow the tunnel route to be threaded through the future foundations.

The Downtown Shopping Centre closed on 28 May 2016 after 41 years and by 23 November had been demolished. It is being replaced with a 36-storey skyscraper which will include a new shopping centre that includes a supermarket, bars, restaurants and food outlets in the lower levels. Auckland Council and proprietors Precinct Properties struck a deal to include tunnels for the City Rail Link directly underneath the premises.

See also 
 List of shopping centres in New Zealand

References

External links 

 Downtown Shopping Centre

Buildings and structures in Auckland
Shopping centres in the Auckland Region
1970s architecture in New Zealand
Shopping malls established in 1975
Shopping malls disestablished in 2016
Auckland CBD
Auckland waterfront